The Ancient Monuments and Archaeological Sites and Remains Act (or AMASR Act) is an act of the Parliament of India that provides for the preservation of ancient and historical monuments and archaeological sites and remains of national importance, for the regulation of archaeological excavations and for the protection of sculptures, carvings and other like objects. It was passed in 1958.

The Archaeological Survey of India functions under the provisions of this act.

The rules stipulate that area in the vicinity of the monument, within 100 metres is prohibited area. The area within 200 meters of the monument is regulated category. Any repair or modifications of buildings in this area requires prior permission.

It is expected that there will be amendments to this act soon as mentioned by the culture minister of India

See also
 Ancient Monuments Preservation Act 1904
 List of Acts of the Parliament of India

References

Acts of the Parliament of India 1958